The enzyme phosphoinositide 5-phosphatase (EC 3.1.3.36) catalyzes the reaction 

1-phosphatidyl-1D-myo-inositol 4,5-bisphosphate + H2O  1-phosphatidyl-1D-myo-inositol 4-phosphate + phosphate

This enzyme belongs to the family of hydrolases, specifically those acting on phosphoric monoester bonds.  The systematic name is phosphatidyl-myo-inositol-4,5-bisphosphate 4-phosphohydrolase. Other names in common use include type II inositol polyphosphate 5-phosphatase, triphosphoinositide phosphatase, IP3 phosphatase, PtdIns(4,5)P2 phosphatase, triphosphoinositide phosphomonoesterase, diphosphoinositide phosphatase, inositol 1,4,5-triphosphate 5-phosphomonoesterase, inositol triphosphate 5-phosphomonoesterase, phosphatidylinositol-bisphosphatase, phosphatidyl-myo-inositol-4,5-bisphosphate phosphatase, phosphatidylinositol 4,5-bisphosphate phosphatase, polyphosphoinositol lipid 5-phosphatase, and phosphatidyl-inositol-bisphosphate phosphatase.  This enzyme participates in inositol phosphate metabolism and phosphatidylinositol signaling system.

Structural studies

References

 
 
 Cockcroft, S. (Ed.), Biology of Phosphoinositides, Biology of Phosphoinositides, Oxford, 2000, p. 320-338.

EC 3.1.3
Enzymes of known structure